Llewellyn Thomas (16 February 1865 – 21 August 1924) was an English cricketer. Thomas played primarily as a wicketkeeper.

Thomas represented Middlesex in a single first-class match in 1893 against Yorkshire.  In the Middlesex first innings, Thomas was stumped for a duck by David Hunter from the bowling of Bobby Peel.  Thomas was unbeaten on 0 when Middlesex's second innings came to an end.  Keeping wicket, he also took 5 catches.

References

External links
Llewellyn Thomas at Cricinfo
Llewellyn Thomas at CricketArchive

1865 births
1924 deaths
Cricketers from Bristol
English cricketers
Middlesex cricketers
Wicket-keepers